The Tarka Valley Railway in Devon, England, is a proposed heritage railway based on plans to rebuild the Barnstaple to Halwill Junction railway line. The railway has been fenced off from the Tarka Trail ensuring the safety of all involved. Restoration of various items of railway stock is currently under way.

History of the line

Built by the North Devon Railway, it opened on 18 July 1872, operated by the London and South Western Railway. Torrington railway station operated services to Bideford and Barnstaple, as well as to Exeter St Davids. From 1880 the line connected with the narrow gauge freight only Torrington and Marland Railway. On grouping in 1923 the Torrington to Barnstaple line became part of the Southern Railway (SR). In 1925 the Torrington and Marland Railway was rebuilt as a standard gauge line and opened through to Halwill Junction as the North Devon and Cornwall Junction Light Railway. A passenger service operated until 1965, when the line again reverted to carrying goods only, until the line through Torrington was closed completely.

Milk trains
The SR and later the Southern Region of British Railways ran two regular milk trains up from Torrington every day, which served both the United Dairies creamery and bottling plant at Vauxhall and the Express Dairies creamery at Morden (both in London). Filled by road tankers from the Torridge Vale Dairies, the first train (of eight wagons) left Torrington at 14:47, the second (of six) at 16:37, split due to the weight of the full milk tank wagons. The first train arrived at Clapham Junction in the evening, and reduced its length by half so that it did not block Vauxhall station while unloading. It would then proceed to Vauxhall, and pull into the "down" side platform, where a discharge pipe was provided to the creamery on the other side of the road. There was also pedestrian access from below the station, under the road to the depot, in the tunnel where the pipeline ran. Unloaded trains would then proceed to Waterloo, where they would reverse and return to Clapham Junction to pick up the other half of the train. The procedure was then repeated, so that the entire first milk train was unloaded between the end of evening peak traffic and the start of the following morning. The second train from Torrington would also split at Clapham Junction, but only half of its milk tanks would be hauled to Vauxhall, while the other half were dispatched to the Express Dairies depot at Morden. In the late morning, both trains with empty milk tanks would be combined into one express train, and returned to Torrington. Milk trains from Torrington stopped in 1978, the last milk train on the former SR.

Closure
Torrington railway station was closed for regular passenger services in 1965 under the Beeching Axe. Due to both the china clay and the milk train traffic, freight trains and the occasional passenger special used the line until 1982.

After full closure, the station building was converted to a public house, which it still is.

Preservation
During the 1990s the track was lifted and the station became a public house. The former track bed was not to be built on, in case British Rail decided it wanted to rebuild the line. The ownership of the line was transferred to Devon County Council, who turned it into a cycle trail. The owner of the public house 'The Puffing Billy' started to acquire rolling stock and a small diesel locomotive, and in 2008 the Tarka Valley Railway Group was formed.
In 2013 the railway gained planning approval to relay 300 yards of track in the direction of Bideford.

Rolling stock

Future
The future plans of the railway are to build the 300 yard extension and expand its presence at Torrington railway station, with the removal of overgrown vegetation. This would mean they can operate short brake van rides. After this, the railway plans to extend the line towards Bideford railway station. Work has started on extension.

See also
Other local railway attractions:
Lynton and Barnstaple Railway
Lynton and Lynmouth Cliff Railway
Dartmoor Railway
Bideford Railway Heritage Centre

References

External links
Bideford Railway Heritage Centre Website
Tarka Valley Railway Website

Railway museums in England
Heritage railways in Devon
Museums in Devon